Ivor Leclerc (9 February 1915- 16 May 1999) was an American philosopher and Professor of Philosophy at Emory University. He was a president of the Metaphysical Society of America.

Books
 The Philosophy of Nature  
  The Nature of Physical Existence  
  Whitehead's metaphysics,: An introductory exposition 
  The Relevance of Whitehead: Philosophical Essays in Commemoration of the Centenary of the Birth of Alfred North Whitehead

References

20th-century American philosophers
Philosophy academics
1915 births
1999 deaths
Presidents of the Metaphysical Society of America
South African philosophers
South African emigrants to the United States